Walter Robert Adams (1 September 1877 – 25 July 1957) was a British Anglican bishop.

Adams was born in London and studied for eight years at Ardingly College before moving to Hurstpierpoint College for Sixth Form. A first class honours mathematical scholar at Durham University (University College), he was ordained as a deacon in 1901 and as a priest in 1905. Adams served as President of the Durham Union for Epiphany term of 1899.

Curacies in County Durham and Lambeth were followed by five years as a missionary priest in Saskatchewan, Canada. Returning to England he was appointed Assistant Secretary to the Archbishop of Canterbury. This was followed by an academic career.

In 1925 Adams returned to Canada as the first Bishop of Cariboo (1925-1934). In 1933 he was elected Bishop of Kootenay (1934-1947) and for two years, 1933-1934, he looked after both dioceses (Cariboo and Kootenay). In 1942 he became the third Metropolitan of British Columbia (1942-1951) while continuing his diocesan positions. In 1947 he became Archbishop of Yukon (1947-1952) and subsequently Archbishop of British Columbia after the diocese was transferred from Rupert's Land to British Columbia. He was also Acting Primate of the Anglican Church of Canada (1947 and 1950-1951). He relinquished his duties in 1952 and retired in Vernon, Canada where he lived until he died in 1957.

References

1877 births
1957 deaths
People educated at Ardingly College
People educated at Hurstpierpoint College
Alumni of University College, Durham
Metropolitans of British Columbia
Anglican bishops of Yukon
Anglican bishops of Cariboo
Anglican bishops of Kootenay
Presidents of the Durham Union
20th-century Anglican Church of Canada bishops